The Anckorn Nunataks are a group of nunataks and snow-covered hills,  long, between Mount Bailey and Mount Samsel in the eastern part of Palmer Land, Antarctica. They were named by the UK Antarctic Place-Names Committee after J.F. Anckorn, a British Antarctic Survey geologist who worked in the vicinity of this feature.

References 

Nunataks of Palmer Land